Nikola Stamatov (born 2 September 1956) is a Bulgarian water polo player. He competed in the men's tournament at the 1980 Summer Olympics.

References

1956 births
Living people
Bulgarian male water polo players
Olympic water polo players of Bulgaria
Water polo players at the 1980 Summer Olympics
Place of birth missing (living people)